"The Prisoner" is a song written and performed by British singer-songwriter Howard Jones. It was included on his 1989 album Cross That Line and released as a single in 1989, reaching number 30 on the Billboard Hot 100. It was the second single from Cross That Line, following "Everlasting Love", a number-one Adult Contemporary hit.

"The Prisoner" also appears on several of Jones' compilation albums, including 1993's The Best of Howard Jones and 2004's The Very Best of Howard Jones.

Track listings 
7"
A. "The Prisoner" - 4:38
B. "Rubber Morals" - 4:18

12" / CD
A. "The Prisoner (The Portmeirion Mix)" - 6:59
B1. "Rubber Morals" - 4:18
B2. "Have You Heard the News" - 3:55

Personnel
Howard Jones – vocals, keyboards
Ian Stanley – keyboards 
Chris Hughes – drums
Andy Ross – guitar

References 

1989 songs
1989 singles
Howard Jones (English musician) songs
Songs written by Howard Jones (English musician)
Warner Music Group singles
Elektra Records singles
Song recordings produced by Chris Hughes (record producer)
Song recordings produced by Ross Cullum
Song recordings produced by Ian Stanley